The Michaud Affair (in French l'Affaire Michaud) was a political controversy in Quebec that began in 2000. It revolved around  the comments of Parti Québécois supporter Yves Michaud, those of the Quebec Jewish community (through the B'nai B'rith organization) and the subsequent censure motion from the National Assembly of Quebec members of parliament.

The Affair

CKAC Interview
What has been called the "Michaud Affair" started on December 5, 2000, in an interview on the Montreal radio station CKAC. Talk show host Paul Arcand asked: "Don't you feel that there is a lack of interest of a good part of the population on the question of sovereignty and the national question, people who have had enough, for whom it is all over, (who say) let's move on to something else?".

To which Yves Michaud replied: "Well, I will tell you an anecdote. I was... I went to get my hair cut about a month ago. There was a Liberal senator who I will not name who doesn't speak [French]... even though he represents a French-speaking riding and who asked me: 'Are you still a separatist, Yves?' I said 'Yes, yes I am separatist just as you are Jewish. It took 2000 years for your people to have its homeland in Israel.' I said: 'Me, whether it takes 10, 50, or 100 more years it can wait.' So he told me: 'It's not the same.'"

"It's never the same for them. So I said: it is not the same? The Armenians did not suffer, the Palestinians did not suffer, the Rwandans did not suffer. It's always (just) you. You are the only people who suffered in the history of humanity."

"After that, I was fed up. And here we are, I am completely indignant... that some suggested to rename the metro station [named after] Lionel Groulx, who was the spiritual father of two generations of Quebecers and is almost a Quebec idol. It's the B'nai B'rith that did that, which was the extremist phalange... There has been world Zionism... "

The Senator mentioned was Leo Kolber, Michaud later revealed.

Estates-General
On December 12, 2000, the director of B'nai B'rith's Quebec chapter, Robert Libman, sent a memo to then Premier Lucien Bouchard requesting that he stop Michaud from being the PQ's candidate in the Mercier riding.

On December 13, 2000, Michaud presented a memorandum to Quebec's "Estates-General on the situation of the French language". He abandoned some parts of his text to say this, in front of members of the B'nai B'rith who were waiting their turn to speak:

"Groulx invited us 'to have, like the Jews, their rough will to survive, their invincible spirit of solidarity, their imperishable moral armor'. And the historian was giving the example of the Jewish people as a model to be followed so that Quebecers affirm their own national identity and fully assume the heritage of their history. Groulx, who is one of the intellectual guides of two generations of Quebecers and one whose name some wanted to see removed from the Lionel-Groulx station a few years ago, to probably replace it by the "Mordecai Richler" station, the René Lévesque Boulevard by, no doubt, "Ariel Sharon" boulevard, the Jacques-Cartier Place by the "Galganov" place, and so on. It is a little satirical, it is a little bit jokingly that I say that, but I think that some others are exaggerating and going a little too far. Immigrants, we want some. Yes, as much as possible and pushing up to the limit of our capacities to welcome them. Immigrants who will not only have rights but also responsibilities with regard to one of the most generous societies in the world which welcomes them with open arms and wallets, immigrants with responsibilities, that is, understanding and speaking our language, open to our culture, our way of working, of doing things, of interpreting the world in the French language and accompanying us on the road which leads us to the control of all the tools for our development (...) There is an ethnic vote against the sovereignty of the people of Quebec. If we do not integrate our immigrants, well then, we will enter on the slope of the Louisianization, and folklorization of our society."

Condemnation by the National Assembly

On December 13, 2000, the leader of the opposition Liberal Party, Jean Charest, presented to the National Assembly of Quebec a motion condemning references to "an ethnic vote against the sovereignty of the people of Quebec" and speaking of B'nai Brith as "an extremist group against quebecers and against sovereignty", as  expressed by Yves Michaud at the Estates-General.

The Premier at the time, Lucien Bouchard, affirmed that he had been aware of similar remarks made by Michaud three (sic) days earlier and that he had asked Michaud to tone down his remarks in the Estates-General. Since Michaud did not do so and even added fuel to the fire, Bouchard therefore condemned the remarks in the name of his party and the government. The motion was adopted unanimously by the National Assembly.

Interpretation

The Michaud Affair re-awakened the bitter, very emotional and controversial divisions within the Parti Québécois between proponents of "soft nationalists" (aka "nationalistes modérés") versus "hard liners" (aka "purs et durs").

This Affair must be interpreted in the context of long-standing historical tensions between some more radical factions within the Quebec nationalist movement and the English-speaking and Jewish communities of Quebec ("Anglophones"). Consequently, whereas most members of the Anglophone community and the general media consider Michaud's allegations to lean towards antisemitism, to Michaud supporters within the PQ and the sovereigntist movement generally the Michaud Affair is the result of censorship and defamation against the "ethnic Quebecer" minority and its "rightful quest for political independence and autonomy".

Aftermath
On December 19, 2000, former Quebec Premier Jacques Parizeau and around 150 signed an open letter condemning the hasty resolution and supporting Michaud's. The letter was published in several newspapers, including Le Devoir.

The same day, Jacques Brassard, the parliamentary leader of the government at the time, answered also in an open letter to the newspapers, that the motion was not against Yves Michaud himself, but on his comments made as a public person seeking office in the government. He said that the National Assembly had the right to condemn unacceptable propositions made in a political context. He also stated that freedom of speech was not a one-way proposition.

The event, which is said to have been a reason for Lucien Bouchard's resignation on January 11, 2001, was not listed in B'nai Brith's annual compilation of anti-semitic events. 
During an interview for Voir magazine for the week of March 1, 2001, Robert Libman stated that he did not think Yves Michaud was an anti-semite and that his remarks had been distorted.

Michaud later unsuccessfully tried to file a defamation charge against a professor who described him as an anti-semite.

See also
List of subjects related to the Quebec independence movement

External links
National Assembly biography (in French)
Documents on the Michaud Affair including full quotes
Chronology of the Michaud Affair

References

Political history of Quebec
2000 in Canada
2000 controversies
20th century in Quebec
2000 in Quebec
2000s in Quebec
Quebec political scandals
Antisemitism in Quebec